DFP may stand for:

  Data Facility Product, an IBM program product for MVS, and later a component of Data Facility Storage Management Subsystem for MVS
 Davidon-Fletcher-Powell formula in mathematical optimization
 Decimal floating point
 Defensive fighting position, a military term
 Department of Finance and Personnel
 VESA Digital Flat Panel
 Diisopropylfluorophosphate
 Doriot, Flandrin & Parant, a French car manufacturer.
 Dysfunctional Family Picnic, a series of US rock concerts
 DoubleClick for Publishers, merged into Google Ad Manager